The Lincoln Cosmopolitan is a full-size luxury car that was sold by Lincoln from the 1949 through the 1954 model year. All Lincolns were manufactured at Lincoln Assembly, Dearborn, Michigan, while some were sent in "knock-down kits" to regional factories  at Maywood Assembly, Maywood, California or St. Louis Assembly, St.Louis, Missouri, and assembled locally.

First generation (1949-1951)

In 1949, Lincoln introduced its first postwar bodies (the first product lines of the combined Lincoln-Mercury Division); a Mercury Eight-based standard Lincoln and a larger "senior" Lincoln Cosmopolitan utilizing an exclusive body and wheelbase. The two Lincolns were the result of a last-minute revision to Fords original postwar plans for small (Ford), medium (Ford-based Mercury) and large (Lincoln) car variants. When it was decided that the 1949 Ford would be an entirely new, smaller vehicle the originally planned Ford would become the new Mercury, the somewhat longer originally planned Mercury would become the "junior" Lincoln and the originally planned Lincoln would become the "senior" Lincoln Cosmopolitan.

In a departure from previous Lincoln vehicles, the bodywork featured no running boards, with the fenders and doors enclosed together; the Lincolns featured headlights and taillights recessed ("frenched") into the bodywork.  At the time, the styling was referred to as a pontoon design.  Using a feature that would later appear in the later Lincoln Continental sedan, all Lincoln-Mercury four-door sedans featured rear-hinged suicide doors. Alongside the four-door, the Cosmopolitan was sold as a two-door (in standard and Capri trim) and two-door convertible. There was also a four-door fastback sedan body style (marketed as the Cosmopolitan Town Sedan), but fastbacks rapidly went out of style after WWII and after only 7302 Town Sedans were ordered, the model did not return for 1950. Although Lincoln moved 73,507 total cars for the 1949 model year, 1950 production totaled only 28,150, a nearly 60% drop. The retail price for the convertible was US$3,948 ($ in  dollars ).

Sharing its engine with the Ford heavy truck line, the Lincoln and the Lincoln Cosmopolitan were powered by a 337 cubic-inch Ford Flathead V8, becoming the first Lincoln powered by a V8 engine. Ford did not have a full automatic transmission yet, although an experimental automatic known as Liquamatic had been tested in 1941. An attempt to purchase Packard's Ultramatic transmission was unsuccessful as Packard could not supply the transmissions in sufficient quantities, so Ford instead purchased GM Hydramatics. Although Ford and Mercury would gain automatics for 1951, Lincoln continued using the Hydramatic until 1955. The 1951 model year saw the last Lincolns with manual transmissions until the 2000 Lincoln LS.  For the suspension, the chassis was given front coil springs.

All versions of the Lincoln Cosmopolitan came with electro-hydraulically operated windows and front seat as standard equipment, the same was obtainable only as an extra-cost option on the standard Lincoln. With the advent of improved production techniques, Lincoln offered its clients a vast array of color choices, including two tone appearances and offered 23 single colors including metallic selections, and provided 24 two-tone combinations. Optional equipment was a short list to include a heater and windshield defroster and a radio while full wheel covers, rear fender skirts and whitewall tires were standard.  

Alongside the Mercury Eight, the 1949-51 Lincoln Cosmopolitan would gain popularity among customizers creating "lead sleds".

Second generation (1952-1954)

For 1952, the Lincoln-Mercury model line saw a redesign.  A single basic body design was shared between Lincoln and Mercury with Lincoln incorporating several elements to impart a larger, more substantial look. Not only did the Cosmopolitan lose its unique body and wheelbase but it also ceded top rung status to the new Lincoln Capri.  Both Lincoln models differed from the Mercury (now the Mercury Monterey) with their own extended rear quarters, Lincoln-specific grille, bumpers, exterior lamps, instrument panel and other miscellaneous trim and fittings.  In a major change, four-door Lincoln-Mercury vehicles saw the introduction of front-hinged rear doors.  With the convertible reserved for the Capri range, the Cosmopolitan was now limited to two-door hardtop and four-door sedan body types.

Along with the new body Lincoln introduced a ball joint front suspension and a high-compression, overhead valve 317 cubic-inch Lincoln Y-block V8, with the 4-speed Hydramatic as the only available transmission.

Lincolns won the top four spots in the Stock Car category of the Pan American Road Race in both 1952 and 1953. while taking first and second place in 1954.

Presidential state car 
In 1950, under the Harry S. Truman presidency, legend has it that Truman held a grudge with General Motors because they would not give him use of their cars during his run for the 1948 presidential election; thus, he chose Lincoln for the presidential state car.

The White House leased ten Lincoln Cosmopolitans, built by the Henney Motor Company for Lincoln, and modified by the Hess and Eisenhardt Company. The cars were modified with extra headroom to accommodate the tall silk hats popular at the time, and were painted black. Nine of the automobiles had enclosed bodies, while the tenth was an armored convertible especially for President Truman. All ten cars were outfitted with  V8 engines "with heavy-duty Hydra-Matic transmissions."

In 1954, President Dwight D. Eisenhower had the Cosmopolitan convertible fitted with a Plexiglas roof that became known as the "Bubble-top"; it remained in presidential service until 1965.

References

Cosmopolitan
Full-size vehicles
1940s cars
1950s cars